This is a list of venues (pubs, clubs, and cafes) commonly used for concerts and other musical performances in Melbourne, Australia.
Australian Institute of Music - Melbourne campus
 Australian College of the Arts (Collarts)] - Wellington St Campus
 Australian College of the Arts (Collarts)] - Brunswick St Campus
 3rd Class (Closed)
 9th Ward (Closed)
 303 - 303 High St, Northcote
 Abbey Road - 131 Acland Street, St Kilda
 Absolut Space
 Alia
 All Nations Hotel
 Alumbra
 Amber Lounge
 The Argo
 The Arthouse - 616 Elizabeth St, Melbourne (Closed)
 The Arts Centre - St. Kilda Rd, Melbourne.
 Bananas, St Kilda
 Bar Nothing
 Bar Open - 317 Brunswick Street, Fitzroy
 Bendigo Hotel - 125 Johnston Street, Collingwood
 Bennetts Lane Jazz Club - 25 Bennetts Lane, Melbourne
 Bertha Brown - 562 Flinders Street, Melbourne
 Big Mouth - 168 Acland Street, St Kilda
 Billboard - 170 Russell Street, Melbourne.
 The Birmingham Hotel - 333 Smith Street, Fitzroy 
 Blackcat
 Bliss Lounge
 Blue Velvet Bar
 Bluestone Belgian Beer Cafe
 Bombay Rock - 1 Phoenix Street Brunswick - cnr Sydney Road (Closed)
 Boney - 68 Little Collins St, Melbourne
 Borsch, Vodka & Tears
 Bridie O' Reilly's
 Brown Alley
 The Brunswick Green
 Brunswick Hotel
 Builders Arms, The - 211 Gertrude Street, Fitzroy 
 Cafe Segovia
 Caffe Cortile
 Candy Bar (closed)
 The Central Club - 293 Swan Street, Richmond
 Chaise Lounge
 The Chandelier Room - 91 Cochranes Road, Moorabbin
 Champagne Lounge
 Charlies Bar
 Charltons
 Cheers
 Cherry Bar - ACDC Lane, Melbourne
 Cherry Tree (Closed)
 Chi Lounge
 Cloud Nine
 Club Cartel
 Club Odeon
 Collins Quarter
 Comedy Theatre - 240 Exhibition St, Melbourne.
 Commercial - Yarraville
 Corner Hotel - 57 Swan St, Richmond
 Cornish Arms, The - 163A Sydney Road, Brunswick
 Curve Bar
 Cristal Bar - Suite 8, 402 Chapel Street, South Yarra. (Closed)
 Curtin Bandroom
 Dan O'Connell Hotel - 225 Canning St, Carlton, Melbourne. 
 Dantes (Closed)
 De Biers
 Ding Dong Lounge - 18 Market Ln, Chinatown, Melbourne.
 Dizzy's - Richmond
Dogs Bar - 54 Acland Street, St Kilda 
 The Drunken Poet - Peel Street, West Melbourne.
 East Brunswick Club - 280 Lygon St, East Brunswick. (Closed)
 Edinburgh Castle - Sydney Road, Brunswick.
 Elsternwick Hotel - 259 Brighton Rd, Elwood.
 The Elwood Lounge - 49-51 Glenhuntly Road, Elwood
Ember Lounge, The - 88 Acland Street, St Kilda
 Empress of India - 714 Nicholson St, Fitzroy North
 Esplanade Hotel, The - 11 The Esplanade, St. Kilda
 The Eureka Hotel, Corner of Church Street and Victoria Street, Richmond
 Evelyn Hotel - 351 Brunswick Street, Fitzroy.
 Exit Strategy Studios, 20 Ovens Street
 Festival Hall - 300 Dudley St, West Melbourne.
 FortyFive Downstairs - 45 Flinders Ln, Melbourne.
 Fiftyfive -  55 Elizabeth St, Melbourne VIC 3000
 The Forum - 154 Flinders St, Melbourne.
 The Great Britain Hotel, Richmond
 Gertrudes Brown Couch - 30 Gertrude Street, Fitzroy.
 The Grace Darling Hotel - 114 Smith Street, Collingwood
 Greyhound Hotel - 1 Brighton Rd St Kilda, Melbourne (Closed)
 Grumpy's Green
 The Gasometer Hotel - 484 Smith St, Collingwood VIC 3066
 Hamer Hall
 Horse Bazaar
 Howler - 7-11 Dawson St, Brunswick VIC 3056
 Hume Blues Club @ The Shake Shack - 19 Harding Street, Coburg
 Hugs&Kisses Club - 22 Sutherland St, Melbourne VIC 3000 (Closed 2019)
 IDGAFF Bar - 160 Hoddle Street, Abbotsford.
 The John Curtin Hotel - 29 Lygon Street, Carlton.
 Loop - 23 Meyers Place, Melbourne
 Lost on Barkly - 211 Barkly Street, St Kilda
 Lounge - 1/243 Swanston St, Melbourne (Closed 2019)
 Lounge Pit - 388 Brunswick St, Fitzroy
Lyrebird Lounge - 61 Glen Eira Road, Ripponlea
 Manchester Lane - 36 Manchester Lane, Melbourne.
 Max Watt's (formerly the Hi-Fi) - 125 Swanston St, Melbourne.
 Melbourne & Olympic Parks (and Rod Laver Arena) - Batman Ave, Melbourne
 Memo Music Hall - 88 Acland Street, St Kilda
 Mercat Basement - 456 Queen St, Melbourne. (Closed 2016)
 Micawber Tavern - Cnr Gully Cres & Monbulk Rd, Belgrave.
 Mr Boogie Man Bar, Hoddle Street, Abbotsford
 MusicLand - 1359a Sydney Rd, Fawkner.
 Newtown Workers Club  - 51 Brunswick St, Fitzroy.
 Nighthawk Blues Restaurant and Bar - 114-116 Nepean Hwy, Mentone.
 Noise Bar - Brunswick
 Northcote Social Club
 The Old Bar - 74 Johnston Street, Fitzroy
 Open Studio Northcote
 Order of Melbourne, The - Level 2, 401 Swanston Street, Melbourne 
 The Palace - Lower Esplanade, St Kilda
 The Palace Hotel, Camberwell
 Palace Theatre - 20 Bourke St, Melbourne..
 The Palais Theatre - Lower Esplanade, St Kilda.
 The Palms (At Crown Casino) - Southern Bank of Melbourne's Yarra River.
 Paris Cat Jazz Club - 6 Goldie Pl, Melbourne.
 The Peninsula Lounge - 475 Moorooduc Hwy, Moorooduc.
 The Penny Black
 Portland Hotel - Cnr Lt Collins & Russell Sts, Melbourne.
 The Post Office Hotel - 229-231 Sydney Rd, Coburg
 Prince Bandroom - 29 Fitzroy St. St Kilda.
 Princess Theatre - 163 Spring St, Melbourne.
 The Last Chance - 238 Victoria Street, North Melbourne.
 The Punters Club - 376 Brunswick Street, Fitzroy
 Pure Pop Records - St. Kilda
 Red Bennies
 Regent Theatre - 191 Collins St, Melbourne.
 The Retreat Hotel - 430 Sydney Road, Brunswick
 Revolver Upstairs - 229 Chapel St, Prahran.
 Rochester Castle - 202 Johnston St, Fitzroy.
 Rounds & Rounds
 Rosstown Hotel, The - Cnr Koornang & Dandenong Rd, Carnegie.
 Roxanne Parlour - 2 Coverlid Place, Melbourne
 Rubix Warehouse - 36 Phoenix St, Brunswick. 
 Ruby's Music Room - Cnr. Little Lonsdale St and Bennetts Lane, Melbourne
 Sidney Myer Music Bowl
 Sippers - 164 Rathdowne St, Carlton.
 Sooki Lounge - 1648 Burwood Highway, Belgrave.
 Spiegeltent - Beside National Gallery, Swanston Street, South Bank.
 The Spot - 133 Sydney Road, Brunswick. (Closed)
 Sossa Deli Cafe - Fitzroy
 The Sub Club - Flinders Ct, Melbourne VIC 3000
 Surabaya Johnny's - 47 Blessington Street, St Kilda
 Toff in Town - 252 Swanston Street, Melbourne.
 Thornbury Local
 Thornbury Theatre
 The Tote Hotel - 71 Johnston St, Collingwood.
 Trades Hall
 Uptown Jazz Cafe - 177 Brunswick St, Fitzroy
Vineyard, The - 71a Acland Street, St Kilda
 Wesley Anne - High Street, Northcote.
 Wheelers Hill Hotel - 871 Ferntree Gully Rd, Wheelers Hill
 Workers Club - 51 Brunswick Street, Fitzroy
 Yah Yahs - Smith Street, Firzroy
 Yours&Mine - 229 Queensberry St, Carlton VIC 3053

See also
 List of music venues

References

 
Melbourne
Melbourne, Music venues
Melbourne-related lists
Venues, Melbourne
Lists of tourist attractions in Victoria (Australia)